The Howard Gardner Nichols Memorial Library (also called Alabama City Library) is a historic building in Gadsden, Alabama, United States. The library was built in 1902 by the Nichols family, owners of the Dwight Manufacturing Company. It is named in honor of their son, who was badly injured while supervising the construction of the company's mill in what was then Alabama City. He died several days later.

The library is the home of NEAGS, the NorthEast Alabama Genealogical Society, and houses over 5,000 family files as well as family books and many references for the counties in northeast Alabama. Also found are Civil War and Revolutionary War references as well as books on genealogy and history of states close to Alabama. The building housed the first lending library in the state of Alabama. At one time it was a day care center for the mill workers' children. It also was a lawyer's office. Now the library is solely owned by NEAGS, dedicated to genealogy research.

The building is similar in scale to the mill workers' houses that surround it, but its location on a corner lot and blend of Classical Revival and Victorian design make it a focal point of the neighborhood. It has a steeply pitched hip roof with deep, bracketed eaves. The façade is anchored by a semi-circular portico supported by six Ionic columns, flanked by windows with lancet arched upper sashes. It was purchased and restored in 1973 by the NorthEast Alabama Genealogical Society. The building was listed on the National Register of Historic Places in 1974.

References

External links
Northeast Alabama Genealogical Society

National Register of Historic Places in Etowah County, Alabama
Libraries on the National Register of Historic Places in Alabama
Victorian architecture in Alabama
Neoclassical architecture in Alabama
Government buildings completed in 1902
Buildings and structures in Gadsden, Alabama